Wazirabad is a district of Kabul, Afghanistan, which like Afshar district is populated primarily by Shia-Hazara.

See also
 Kabul City

References

Neighborhoods of Kabul